Agroeca brunnea is a species of spider in the family Liocranidae. It is found in the Palearctic realm and was first described by John Blackwall in 1833.

The distinctive egg sacs are known colloquially as 'fairy lamps' and the spider itself is sometimes called the 'fairy lamp spider'.

Gallery

References

Corinnidae
Spiders described in 1833
Palearctic spiders